Tanya Hemanth (born 19 September 2003) is an Indian badminton player.

Achievements

BWF International Challenge/Series (2 titles, 1 runner-up)
Women's singles

  BWF International Challenge tournament
  BWF International Series tournament
  BWF Future Series tournament

BWF Junior International (2 titles, 1 runner-up) 
Girls' singles

  BWF Junior International Grand Prix tournament
  BWF Junior International Challenge tournament
  BWF Junior International Series tournament
  BWF Junior Future Series tournament

External links

References 

Living people
2003 births
Indian female badminton players